Emile Decroix (5 March 1904 – 1 April 1967) was a Belgian racing cyclist. He rode in the 1932 Tour de France.

References

1904 births
1967 deaths
Belgian male cyclists
Place of birth missing